Ioannis Zaimis (Greek: Ιωάννης Ζαΐμης, 1797–1882) was a Greek MP for Achaia and the first Mayor of Patras.

He was born in 1797 and was the son of Asimakis Zaimis, part of the famous Zaimis family that produced famous revolutionary heroes.  He took part of the revolution of 1821 and battled for Patras.  He married Angeliki Kanakari-Roufo.  He became the first mayor of Patras in 1836 and was an antiroyalist.  A year later, he would leave the mayor's seat and Ioannis Boukaouris took over as the second mayor.  In the second municipal election in 1837, he was president of the municipal council.  He was appointed MP for Kalavryta in 1841 and in 1843, he became a member of the municipal council again.

He died on September 24, 1882.  He was uncle of the Prime Minister Thrasivoulos Zaimis.

References
1836-2006 Dimarchoi Patreon (1836-2006 Δήμαρχοι Πατρέων = Mayors Of Patras From 1836 Until 2006), Petros Psomas, Donti 
The first version of the article is translated and is based from the article at the Greek Wikipedia (el:Main Page)

1797 births
1882 deaths
Mayors of Patras
People from Kalavryta